Casey Vincent may refer to:

Casey Vincent (athlete), Australian athlete of the 2000 and 2004 Olympic games
Clinton D. "Casey" Vincent (1914–1955), U.S. Air Force fighter ace and general officer